Nukus Airport ( / ;  / )  is an airport serving Nukus, the capital city of Karakalpakstan, an autonomous republic within Uzbekistan. The airport services more than twenty passenger flights to other cities in Uzbekistan and CIS weekly.

Facilities

Airlines and destinations

See also
List of the busiest airports in the former USSR
Transportation in Uzbekistan

References

External links
 
 

Airports in Uzbekistan
Nukus